Nacoleia rhoeoalis is a species of moth of the family Crambidae. It is found in New South Wales, Queensland, Victoria, Western Australia and Tasmania. The species was first described by Francis Walker in 1859.

The wingspan is about 10 mm.

The larvae feed on the dead leaves of Eucalyptus species.

References

Moths of Australia
Moths described in 1859
Nacoleia